Xinjian Township is a township under the administration of Yingjing County, in central Sichuan, China. , it has four villages under its administration.

References 

Township-level divisions of Sichuan
Yingjing County